John Thayne was an Anglican priest.

Thane was educated at Trinity College, Cambridge and incorporated at Oxford in 1682. He held livings at Kirby Underdale and Northenden. He was appointed a Canon of Chester Cathedral in 1686 and Archdeacon of Chester from 1707, holding both positions until his death on 30 June 1727. He is buried at the cathedral.

References

1727 deaths
Alumni of Trinity College, Cambridge
Archdeacons of Chester
People from Cheshire